Slovenia competed at the 2015 European Games, in Baku, Azerbaijan from 12 to 28 June 2015.

Medalists

Archery

Basketball (3x3)

Men's team – Jure Eržen, Uroš Troppan, Dario Krejić, Boris Jeršin
Women's team – Živa Zdolšek, Urša Žibert, Ana Ljubenović, Maša Piršič

Gymnastics

Artistic
 Men's individual – Sašo Bertoncelj
 Women's individual – Saša Golob

Triathlon

 Men's individual – Domen Dornik
 Women's individual – Eva Skaza

References

Nations at the 2015 European Games
European Games
2015